Alexander Volberg is a Russian mathematician. He is working  in operator theory, complex analysis and harmonic analysis. He received the Salem Prize in 1988 for his work in harmonic analysis. Also he received the Lars Onsager medal in 2004. He is currently a University Distinguished Professor at Michigan State University. From 2007-2008 he was the Sir Edmund Whittaker Professor of Mathematical Science at the University of Edinburgh.

He was named to the 2021 class of fellows of the American Mathematical Society "for contributions to harmonic analysis and its relations to geometric measure theory".

References

External links
 
 Alexander Volberg Homepage
 Lecture on the Memorial Rubio de Francia
 Alexander von Humboldt Foundation

1966 births
Living people
Russian mathematicians
Michigan State University faculty
Academics of the University of Edinburgh
Fellows of the American Mathematical Society